The Multum from Information Computer Systems (ICS) was a 16-bit  minicomputer developed in the early 1970s in Crewe, Cheshire by ex-employees of English Electric Company. It had a very early port of Pascal.

References

Minicomputers
Computer-related introductions in 1973
Crewe